Candice Ann Rialson (December 18, 1951 – March 31, 2006), also known as Candy Rialson, was an American actress known for her starring role in Hollywood Boulevard (1976). According to one obituary, "although never reluctant to take her clothes off, Rialson was always more 'cutie' than sleazy, but she became so notorious for her B-movie work that mainstream directors hesitated to hire her". She inspired the character played by Bridget Fonda in Jackie Brown.

Biography

Early life
Rialson was born in Santa Monica, California and grew up in Tustin, near Santa Ana in Orange County, California. At age 18, she won Miss Hermosa Beach and worked as a go-go dancer. She studied vet science at UC Davis but quit after a month.

The title of Miss Hermosa Beach led to a small part in The Gay Deceivers (1969), which sparked her interest in an acting career.

Exploitation films
She was living in Malibu when a neighbor suggested she might be ideal for the lead in a low budget film, Pets (1973). Rialson was cast and her career was launched.

She began to get work on TV appearing in episodes of Shaft, The Magician, Adam's Rib and Maude.

New World Pictures offered her the lead in a "nurses" picture, Candy Stripe Nurses (1974), produced by Julie Corman. This led to a role in another exploitation film, Mama's Dirty Girls (1974) with Gloria Grahame. She had a small part in the TV films The Girl on the Late, Late Show (1974) and Guilty or Innocent: The Sam Shephard Murder Case (1975). Rialson described her part in the latter as "my usual Candice Rialson role, I flirted with him [star George Peppard] and got on the back of his Harley and said a few short, sweet things."

Rialson had a small role in The Eiger Sanction (1975) as an art student in college who volunteers to do anything for her professor, played by Clint Eastwood, in return for a good grade. She returned to New World to star in Summer School Teachers (1975), also produced by Julie Corman. "Candice was a rare combination," said Corman later. "She was a good actress and a beautiful girl. She had a real flair for comedy. She also helped keep a good mood on set which was very important."

Teri Shwartz offered her the lead in a New World Picture about roller skaters, but she turned it down as she did not want to be in any more "three girl" movies. Instead she appeared in one scene in Silent Movie (1976) directed by Mel Brooks, as a nurse who slapped Marty Feldman. However her scene ended up being reshot with another actress.

Rialson returned to New World to star in Hollywood Boulevard (1976), the directorial debut of Joe Dante and Allan Arkush.

Her last leading role was in Chatterbox (1977), a film for producer Tom De Simone about a woman with a talking vagina. "I didn't know what it was about when I auditioned but I got the picture real quick," said Rialson later. Bruce Curtis wanted to sign Rialson to a three picture deal but this fell through.

Rialson had a bit part in Logan's Run (1976) and had small roles in Moonshine County Express (1977) and Stunts (1978).

Her final film was the 1978 political thriller Winter Kills (1979) playing a girl who rubs John Huston's crotch. "I never took any of it too seriously," Rialson later said. "Everything came easily for me. While there were just as talented and knock down gorgeous actresses out there who couldn't even get agents. I was getting scripts delivered to my house... I was really busy but I couldn't appreciate that at the time."

According to Diabolique magazine:
Of all the seventies exploitation starlets, I feel Rialson had the best chance of breaking through to mainstream stardom, or at least fame – she was attractive but not threateningly so, affable, skilled at comedy and drama, with a first-rate on-set attitude... But she never got the chance. In fact out of all the New World female leads, only one, Pam Grier, got the lead in a studio feature, and that was decades later, with Jackie Brown. Rialson, Roberta Collins, Pat Anderson, Claudia Jennings, Rainbeaux Smith... they all struggled to break through to the next level, leading one to conclude they were simply discriminated against in Hollywood.

Retirement
She retired from acting to become a wife and mother. "I just didn't want to do it anymore," she later said. She married in 1980 and moved to Studio City and had one child. She died of liver disease on March 31, 2006 in Palmdale, California.

Influence
Quentin Tarantino claimed Rialson was the inspiration for Bridget Fonda's character in 1997's Jackie Brown.

Filmography

References

Notes

External links

' Candice Rialson 1952-2006' Sergio Leone and the Infield Fly Rule 10 August 2006
'The Wonderful Candice Rialson Is Gone', JOHNNY LARUE'S CRANE SHOT 9 August 2006

1951 births
2006 deaths
Deaths from liver disease
American film actresses
Actresses from Santa Monica, California
20th-century American actresses
21st-century American women